English musician Ringo Starr has released twenty studio albums and forty-six singles. Starr achieved international fame as a member of British rock band the Beatles. When the band broke up in 1970, Starr embarked on a solo career. Along with the other Beatles, he spent the first half of the 1970s on Apple Records, the label created by the band for themselves. Starr moved to Atlantic Records after his contract with EMI expired and his career diminished in commercial impact, even though he continued to record and eventually tour with his All-Starr Band in 1989.

Albums

Studio albums

Notes
 A^ Beaucoups of Blues also peaked at No. 35 on the Billboard Top Country Albums chart.
 B^ Ringo Rama and Choose Love also peaked at No. 6 and No. 29 respectively on the Billboard Top Independent Albums chart.
 C^ Liverpool 8 also peaked at No. 94 on the Billboard Top Internet Albums chart.
 D^ Y Not and Ringo 2012 also peaked at No. 16 and No. 21 respectively on the Billboard Top Rock Albums chart.

Live albums

Solo

Ringo Starr & His All-Starr Band

Compilation albums

Solo

Ringo Starr & His All-Starr Band

Other albums

Singles

Notes

 E^ "Act Naturally" also peaked at No. 27 on the Billboard Hot Country Songs and at No. 50 on the Canadian Country Songs chart.

Promo singles

Extended plays

Collaborations and other appearances

Studio

Live

As session musician and songwriter

Video

Video albums

Solo
 VH1 Storytellers - 1998

Ringo Starr and His All-Starr Band
 Ringo Starr and His All-Starr Band - 1990
 Volume 2: Live from Montreux - 1993
 Ringo Starr and His Third All-Starr Band Volume 1 - 1997
 Ringo Starr and His Fourth All-Starr Band - 1998
 The Best of Ringo Starr and His All Starr Band So Far... - 2001
 Most Famous Hits - 2003
 Tour 2003 - 2003
 Live 2006 - 2008
 Live at the Greek Theatre 2008 - 2010
 Ringo at the Ryman - 2013

Ringo Starr and The Roundheads
 Sound Stage - 2009

Music videos

See also
 The Beatles discography
 List of songs recorded by Ringo Starr

References
 Footnotes

 Citations

Discography
Rock music discographies
Discographies of British artists